Georgiana Iuliana Anitei (born 26 March 1999) is a Romanian female triple jumper, who won an individual gold medal at the Youth World Championships.

References

External links

1999 births
Living people
Romanian female triple jumpers